Maximilian Arndt (born 23 July 1987) is a former German bobsledder who has competed since 2003. He originally competed in luge before a coach suggested that he try bobsleigh. He won four-man and two-man golds at the 2011 World Junior Championships at Park City. As of February 2014 he has scored seven wins in the Bobsleigh World Cup: five in four-man, one in two-man and one in team competition.

References

External links
 
 

1987 births
Living people
German male bobsledders
Bobsledders at the 2014 Winter Olympics
Olympic bobsledders of Germany
People from Suhl
Sportspeople from Thuringia
21st-century German people